Poplar Hall is a historic home and farm located near Newark, New Castle County, Delaware. The property includes six contributing buildings. They are an 18th-century brick dwelling with its stone wing and five associated outbuildings. The house is a -story, gable-roofed, brick structure with a -story, cobblestone, gable-roofed wing.  It was substantially remodeled in the mid-19th century in the Greek Revival style.  Also on the property are a contributing -story crib barn (c. 1850), frame smokehouse, frame dairy, implement shed, and cow barn.

It was added to the National Register of Historic Places in 1988.

References

Farms on the National Register of Historic Places in Delaware
Greek Revival houses in Delaware
Houses in Newark, Delaware
National Register of Historic Places in New Castle County, Delaware